Majdan Abramowski is a village in the administrative district of Gmina Goraj, within Biłgoraj County, Lublin Voivodeship, in eastern Poland.

From 1975 to 1998, the village was administratively attached to the Zamość Voivodship.

The village has a population of 113.

References

Villages in Biłgoraj County